This is a comprehensive list of songs recorded by the English punk rock band the Clash that have been officially released. The list includes songs that have been performed by the band.  Other side projects are not included in this list. The list consists of mostly studio recordings; remixes and live recordings are not listed, unless the song has only been released in one of the two formats. Singles are listed as having been released on their respective albums, unless the single has no associated album.

Songs

See also

 The Clash discography
 The Clash on film

References

External links
 The Clash discography on the Clash Official Site.
 The Clash discography at Connolly & Company.
 The Clash at Discogs.
 Albums by the Clash at Rate Your Music.

 
Clash, The
Clash